Paramita Roy (Bangla: পারমিতা মুখার্জি রায়) (born 25 December 1962) is an Australian independent film director, producer, writer, educator and keen photographer. Born in Kolkata, India to Indian parents, Roy has relocated her family to Australia in 1999. Most known for her works on feature films, Hori Alone in Kolkata and Another Day in Paradise as director, producer and writer.

Early life and education
Roy was born as Paramita Mukerjee, the daughter of late Ranada Prasad Mukerjee and Gita Mukerjee (Acharya), a business man and a house wife respectively. Her early education took place in Kolkata, India where she completed a Bachelor of Arts from Calcutta University. She left India when she was 23, to Riyadh, Saudi Arabia where she lived for 5 years, before moving to Papua New Guinea in 1993. She later studied at the Queensland University of Technology for a bachelor's and master's degree in education. Recently, Roy has completed a Theatre Directing course at the National Institute of Dramatic Art (NIDA), and a post graduate study in Film Directing at the Australian Film Television and Radio School (AFTRS) in Sydney, Australia.

Career
Roy started her career as a school teacher and has taught in Canada, Papua New Guinea, Saudi Arabia and Australia. Currently, she teaches ICT at St Dominic's Priory College  Adelaide, Australia.

In 2002, she initiated the Northern Territory Film-makers Association (NTFA) in Darwin, Australia along with the Down Under International Film Festival as a founding member and secretary till she moved to Canberra in 2004. While in Darwin, she directed many short films including People of the Rock, Tell Me Why and Reaching to Me. In an international collaboration, Roy directed a feature film on child labour, which was mentioned at the Australian Capital Territory Legislative Assembly by Karin MacDonald. The film, Hori Alone in Kolkata was screened in Australia and India.  Roy has received several accolades for her photography including the Life's Reflection Photography Award presented by the Chief Minister Jon Stanhope. In 2008–2009, Roy directed another feature film, Another Day in Paradise, which was about three teachers from Australia, Romania and India and their journey. The film premiered in Australia in February 2010. Between 2005–2008, Roy has had many of her articles published and presented at the national conference held by the Australian Council for Computers in Education. During her studies at NIDA, she directed a reflective piece about Indian students in Australia, called Paradise Lost. This was followed by another documentary and short film in 2010, Portrait of an Unknown Cabbie and The Leper, which were screened in Sydney, Australia.

Filmography
Short Films
 Reaching to Me (2002) Subject: Domestic Violence
 Tell Me Why? (2002) - Subject: Children in Detention Centre
 Our Planet, Our Future (2003) Subject: Pollution (Environment)
 People of the Rock (2004) Subject: Prejudice
 God Tag (Producer) 2004 Subject: Indigenous Australians
 Paradise Lost (2010) Subject: Story of an Indian Student in Australia
 The Leper (2010) Subject: Outcast
 Portrait of an Unknown Cabbie (2010) A documentary about an ethnic taxi driver in Australia
 Hori Alone in Kolkata (2006)
 Another Day in Paradise (2010)

External links
www.paramitaroy.com

References

Living people
1962 births
Australian film directors
Australian women film directors
Australian people of Indian descent
Bengali people
Film directors from Kolkata
Queensland University of Technology alumni
University of Calcutta alumni